"My Kz, Ur Bf" (often stylised as "MY KZ, UR BF"; an abbreviation of "My Keys, Your Boyfriend") is a song from British indie pop band Everything Everything. The track was released in the United Kingdom on 5 October 2009 as the third single from the band's debut studio album, Man Alive (2010).

Background and composition
The song began as what Jonathan Higgs has described as "an old demo I made in a sort of R&B pastiche style". The band released this demo, under the title "Airstrike On Your Forehead", on their official SoundCloud page, explaining how the song had been altered and stripped down since the demo version.

"My Kz, Ur Bf" is characterised by its usage of numerous synthesizers, complex syncopated rhythms, fast-paced vocals, and rich backing vocals. In a self-released video on the band's YouTube channel, Higgs describes the song's exploration of "two different types of America", referring to the stark contrast between the "superficial sitcom world" and "killing people in foreign lands". The song imagines a superimposition of the two environments, and how insignificant one would seem in the presence of the other.

The band filmed the video for the original 2009 version inside Hack Green Secret Nuclear Bunker in Cheshire.

Track listing

Charts
For the chart week dated 4 September 2010, "My Kz, Ur Bf" debuted as number 121 on the UK Singles Chart—marking the band's second appearance on the chart; following "Schoolin'" (number 152, 2010).

Release history

References

2008 songs
2009 singles
Everything Everything songs
Songs written by Jonathan Higgs
Geffen Records singles
Satirical songs